John Davis ( – 29 December 1605) was one of the chief navigators of Queen Elizabeth I of England. He led several voyages to discover the Northwest Passage and served as pilot and captain on both Dutch and English voyages to the East Indies. He discovered the Falkland Islands in August 1592.

Life and career
Davis was born in the parish of Stoke Gabriel in Devon circa 1550, and spent his childhood in Sandridge Barton nearby. It has been suggested that he learned much of his seamanship as a child while playing boats along the river Dart, and went to sea at an early age. His childhood neighbours included Adrian Gilbert and Humphrey Gilbert and their half-brother Walter Raleigh. From early on, he also became friends with John Dee.

 He began pitching a voyage in search of the Northwest Passage to the queen's secretary Francis Walsingham in 1583. Two years later, in 1585, the secretary relented and funded the expedition, which traced Frobisher's route to Greenland's east coast, around Cape Farewell, and west towards Baffin Island. In 1586 he returned to the Arctic with four ships, two of which were sent to Greenland's iceberg-calving eastern shore; the other two penetrated the strait which came to bear his name as far as 67°N before being blocked by the Arctic ice cap. Sunshine attempted (and failed) to circumnavigate the island from the east. The initially amiable approach Davis adopted to the Inuit  bringing musicians and having the crew dance and play with them  changed after they stole one of his anchors; they were likely irate at having been interrupted during one of their religious ceremonies. Inuit also attacked his ships in Hamilton Inlet (Labrador). A third expedition in 1587 reached 72°12'N and Disko Island before unfavorable winds forced it back. On his return, Davis charted the Davis Inlet in the coast of Labrador. The log of this trip remained a textbook model for later captains for centuries.

In 1588 he seems to have commanded Black Dog against the Spanish Armada. In 1589 he joined the Earl of Cumberland as part of the Azores Voyage of 1589. In 1591 he accompanied Thomas Cavendish on Cavendish's last voyage, which sought to discover the Northwest Passage "upon the back parts of America" (i.e., from the western entrance). After the rest of Cavendish's expedition returned unsuccessful, Davis continued to attempt on his own account the passage of the Strait of Magellan; though defeated by foul weather, he apparently discovered the Falkland Islands in August 1592 aboard Desire. His crew was forced to kill hundreds of penguins for food on the islands, but the stored meat spoiled in the tropics and only fourteen of his 76 men made it home alive.

From 1596 to 1597 Davis seems to have sailed with Sir Walter Raleigh to Cádiz and the Azores as master of Raleigh's ship; from 1598 to 1600 he accompanied a Dutch expedition to the East Indies as pilot, sailing from Flushing and returning to Middleburg, while carefully charting and recording geographical details. He narrowly escaped destruction from treachery at Achin on Sumatra.

From 1601 to 1603 he accompanied Sir James Lancaster as Pilot-Major on the first voyage of the English East India Company. For his part Davis was to receive £500 (around £1.5 million at 2015 values) if the voyage doubled its original investment, £1,000 if three times, £1,500 if four times and £2,000 if five times.

Before departure, Davis had told London merchants that pepper could be obtained in Aceh at a price of four reals of eight per hundredweight - whereas it actually cost 20. When the voyage returned, Lancaster complained that Davis had been wrong about both the price and availability of pepper.  Unhappy at being made a scapegoat for the situation, on 5 December 1604 Davis sailed again for the East Indies as pilot to Sir Edward Michelborne, an "interloper" who had been granted a charter by James I despite the supposed East India Company monopoly on trade with the East. On this journey he was killed off Bintan Island near Singapore by one of his captive "Japanese" pirates whose disabled vessel he had just seized. The pirates had taken the English in through several days of friendly discourse prior to the surprise attack in which the subject was 'dragged back, hacked and slashed, and thrust out again'. He died almost immediately after the attack.

In the centuries after his death, the importance of Dutch whalers actually led the settlements along Greenland's western coast to be called "Straat Davis" after their name for the Strait, while the name "Greenland" was used to refer to the eastern shore, erroneously presumed to be the site of the Norse Eastern Settlement.

Publications
Davis's explorations in the Arctic were published by Richard Hakluyt and appeared on his world map. Davis himself published a valuable treatise on practical navigation called The Seaman's Secrets in 1594 and a more theoretical work called The World's Hydrographical Description in 1595. The account of Davis's last voyage was written by Michelborne on his return to England in 1606.

Inventions

His invention of the backstaff and double quadrant (called the Davis quadrant after him) remained popular among English seamen until long after Hadley's reflecting quadrant had been introduced.

Personal life

On 29 September 1582, Davis married Mistress Faith Fulford, daughter of Sir John Fulford (the High Sheriff of Devon) and Dorothy Bourchier, the daughter of the Earl of Bath. They had four sons and a daughter. On his return from the 1592 voyage, Davis discovered his wife had taken up with a "sleek paramour"; conspiring with this man, a counterfeiter, Faith "brought false and unavailing charges" against Davis.

Davis was also involved a plot to entrap Thomas Aufield, a Catholic priest. Likely acting as an agent provocateur at the direction of his patron, Francis Walsingham, Davis claimed to be a Catholic convert and offered to hand over a number of English ships to the Pope or to Spain to aid the Catholic cause. He met Aufield in Rouen to discuss the proposal. Negotiations failed and he returned to England where Aufield was arrested for circulating Catholic texts. Aufield was tortured and found guilty distributing a book in which found fault the queen's religion. He was hanged on 6 July 1585 at Tyburn.

References

External links 
 

 
 

16th-century English people
17th-century English people
1550s births
1605 deaths
Baffin Bay
British scientific instrument makers
English explorers of North America
English murder victims
Explorers of Canada
Explorers of the Arctic
Male murder victims
People from Dartmouth, Devon
Persons of National Historic Significance (Canada)